Mariusz Fyrstenberg and Santiago González were the defending champions but chose not to defend their title.

Andre Begemann and Jan-Lennard Struff won the title after defeating Carlos Berlocq and Andrés Molteni 6–3, 6–4 in the final.

Seeds

Draw

References
 Main Draw

Canberra Challenger - Doubles